Four sharps may refer to:
E major, a major musical key with four sharps
C-sharp minor, a minor musical key with four sharps